The 2013–14 Professional U18 Development League (League 1 referred to as the Barclays Under 18 Premier League for sponsorship reasons) is the second season of the Professional Development League system.

There are 96 participating teams in the 2013–14 Professional U18 Development Leagues.

League 1

League stage
Teams played each team in their own division twice and each team from the other division once, for a total of 31 games per team. The top two teams from each division progressed to the play-offs to determine the overall winner of the League as a whole.

North Division

South Division

Knockout stage

Semi-finals

Final

League 2

League stage
Teams play each team in their own division twice, and eight of the teams in the other division once, to complete 26 fixtures. The top two teams from each division progress to the knockout stage to determine the overall winner.

North Division

South Division

Knockout stage

Semi-finals

Final

League 3

League stage

North-West Division

North-East Division

South-West Division

South-East Division

See also
 2013–14 Professional U21 Development League
 2013–14 FA Cup
 2013–14 FA Youth Cup
 2013–14 in English football

References

2013–14 in English football leagues
2013-14